List of Valencia metro stations may refer to:

List of Valencia, Spain metro stations
List of Valencia, Venezuela metro stations